In telecommunications networks, RANAP (Radio Access Network Application Part) is a protocol specified by 3GPP in TS 25.413
and used in UMTS for signaling between the Core Network, which can be a MSC or SGSN, and the UTRAN. RANAP is carried over Iu-interface.

RANAP signalling protocol resides in the control plane of Radio network layer of Iu interface in the UMTS (Universal Mobile Telecommunication System) protocol stack. Iu interface is the interface between RNC (Radio Network Controller) and CN (Core Network). nb. For Iu-ps transport RANAP is carried on SCTP if IP interface used on this.

RANAP handles signaling for the Iu-PS - RNC and 3G SGSN and Iu-CS - RNC and 3G MSC . It also provides the signaling channel to transparently pass messages between the User Equipment (UE) and the CN.

In LTE, RANAP has been replaced by S1AP.
In SA (standalone) installations of 5G, S1AP will be replaced by NGAP.

Functionality

Over the Iu interface, RANAP is used to:

- Facilitate general UTRAN procedures from the core network such as paging

- Separate each User Equipment (UE) on protocol level for mobile-specific signaling management

- Transfer transparently non-access signaling

- Request and manage various types of UTRAN radio access bearers

- Perform the Serving Radio Network Subsystem (SRNS) relocation

See also 
 GPRS Tunnelling Protocol (GTP)

References

Network protocols
Mobile telecommunications standards
3GPP standards